Stranger at My Door is a 1956 American Western film directed by William Witney and starring Macdonald Carey, Patricia Medina and Skip Homeier.

Quentin Tarantino called it a "classic" with "the most amazing and terrifying breaking-the- unbreakable-horse sequence in the history of western cinema, including Monte Walsh. Witney became so renowned in the industry for this sequence that when he started directing western TV shows, he was usually brought in to helm their breaking-the-unbreakable-horse episode."

In 1991, a television film also entitled Stranger at My Door was released. The 1991 film had nothing in common with the 1956 release other than the title.

Plot
Outlaw Clay Anderson and his gang rob the town bank and flee in different directions. Clay's horse gives out and he is forced to hide at a nearby farm. Clay soon discovers that the farm belongs to preacher Hollis Jarret, the preacher's new wife, and children.  The preacher lets Clay stay at the farm, reasoning that he can convince the outlaw to turn over a new leaf.

Cast
 Macdonald Carey as Hollis Jarret
 Patricia Medina as Peg Jarret
 Skip Homeier as Clay Anderson 
 Stephen Wootton 'Dodie' Jarret
 Louis Jean Heydt as Sheriff John Tatum 
 Howard Wright as 'Doc' Parks
 Slim Pickens as Ben Silas
 Malcolm Atterbury as Rev. Hastings

References

External links
 
 
 

1956 films
1956 Western (genre) films
American Western (genre) films
Republic Pictures films
Films directed by William Witney
1950s English-language films
1950s American films
American black-and-white films